Arne Hellberg (13 March 1920 – 1977) was a Swedish discus thrower. He won the national title in 1945 and placed fifth at the 1950 European Championships.

References

Swedish male discus throwers
Swedish male shot putters
1920 births
1977 deaths